Grevillea delta is a species of flowering plant in the family Proteaceae and is endemic to restricted area in the south-west of Western Australia. It is a bushy, spreading shrub with hairy branchlets, divided leaves with linear lobes, and groups of red flowers with a red, green-tipped style.

Description

Taxonomy
This grevillea was first formally described in 1986 by Donald McGillivray who gave it the name Grevillea thelemanniana subsp. delta in his book New names in Grevillea (Proteaceae) from specimens collected by Alex George near Mount Lesueur in 1974. In 1994 Peter M. Olde and Neil R. Marriott raised the subspecies to species status as Grevillea delta.

The specific epithet (delta) is a Greek letter, since the species was first referred to as 'Race G' of subspecies thelemanniana.

Distribution and habitat
This grevillea grows in mallee heath near creeks or in low-lying areas and is only known from near the type location.

Conservation status
Grevillea delta is listed as "Priority Two" by the Western Australian Government Department of Biodiversity, Conservation and Attractions, meaning that it is poorly known and from only one or a few locations.

See also
 List of Grevillea species

References

delta
Proteales of Australia
Eudicots of Western Australia
Taxa named by Donald McGillivray